General Sir Reginald Clare Hart,  (11 June 1848 – 18 October 1931), was an Irish British Army officer and recipient of the Victoria Cross, the highest and most prestigious award for gallantry in the face of the enemy that can be awarded to British and Commonwealth forces.

Early life and career
Hart was born at Scarriff, County Clare, son of Henry George Hart and educated at Cheltenham College. He was commissioned in the Royal Engineers.

Details on VC
He was 30 years old, and a lieutenant in the Corps of Royal Engineers, British Army during the Second Anglo-Afghan War when the following deed took place on 31 January 1879 in the Bazar Valley, Afghanistan, for which he was awarded the Victoria Cross:

Later career
Hart was appointed a district commander in Belgaum, Madras Command, on 2 March 1896. Following the outbreak of the Second Boer War in South Africa, he was on 5 October 1899 appointed temporary in command of the Quetta district (whose commander was sent to SA). He stayed there for three years, until November 1902 when he was ordered back to England. On his return, he was appointed General Officer Commanding Thames District, where he took command on 8 December 1902, with the promotion to major-general on the following day. He was concurrently Commandant of the School of Military Engineering. Promoted to general, he served as Lieutenant Governor of Guernsey from 1914 to 1918. He died at Bournemouth, Dorset on 18 October 1931.

Sir Reginald Clare Hart's is buried in St Marys Churchyard, Netherbury, Dorset, England.

References

The Register of the Victoria Cross (1981, 1988 and 1997)

Ireland's VCs  (Dept of Economic Development 1995)
Monuments to Courage (David Harvey, 1999)
Irish Winners of the Victoria Cross (Richard Doherty and David Truesdale, 2000)

External links
Royal Engineers Museum Sappers VCs
Location of grave and VC medal (Dorset)

1848 births
1931 deaths
Burials in Dorset
19th-century Irish people
Irish officers in the British Army
People from County Clare
British Army generals
Knights Grand Cross of the Order of the Bath
Knights Commander of the Royal Victorian Order
People educated at Cheltenham College
Irish recipients of the Victoria Cross
Royal Engineers officers
Second Anglo-Afghan War recipients of the Victoria Cross
Graduates of the Royal Military Academy, Woolwich
British Army recipients of the Victoria Cross